Thomas Heath (10 December 1806 – 16 October 1872) was an English cricketer who played first-class cricket from 1828 to 1848.

A right-handed batsman and wicket-keeper who played for Nottingham and Nottinghamshire, he made 20 known appearances in first-class matches.  He represented the North in the North v. South series.

References

1806 births
1872 deaths
English cricketers
English cricketers of 1826 to 1863
Nottinghamshire cricketers
North v South cricketers
Cricketers from Sutton-in-Ashfield
Nottingham Cricket Club cricketers
Wicket-keepers